Hauptfeldwebel  (HptFw or HF) is the third highest Non-commissioned officer (NCO) grade in German Army and German Air Force. It is grouped as OR-7 / OR-8 in NATO, equivalent to US Army Sergeant 1st Class and Master Sergeant. In army/ air force context NCOs of this rank were formally addressed as Herr Hauptfeldwebel also informally / short Hauptfeld.

History
The Hauptfeldwebel introduced by the German Wehrmacht in 1938, was not as a military rank but an assignment to "company sergeant" ( or ). Most experienced Portepée-NCO with the rank Stabsfeldwebel or Oberfeldwebel (more seldom Feldwebel) have been assigned to that distinguished position. The equivalent assignment in the Waffen-SS was the SS-Stabsscharführer.

The assignment was also used in the GDR National People's Army from 1956 until 1990.

In 1957, the rank was introduced in the West German Armed Forces.

Rank sequence
The sequence of ranks (top-down approach) in that particular group ([[Unteroffiziere mit Portepee|Senior NCOs with portepee]]) is as follows:
OR-9:  / 
OR-8:  / 
OR-7:  / 
OR-6:  / 
OR-6:  /

References

Sources 
BROCKHAUS, Die Enzyklopädie in 24 Bänden (1796–2001), Band 5: 3-7653-3665-3, S. 487, Definition: Hauptfeldwebel/Oberfähnrich
BROCKHAUS, Die Enzyklopädie in 24 Bänden (1796–2001), Band 7: 3-7653-3676-9, S. 185, Hauptfeldwebel

Military ranks of Germany